Kalyan Dhall (born 7 September 1960) is an Indian former cricketer. He played four first-class matches for Bengal between 1984 and 1986.

See also
 List of Bengal cricketers

References

External links
 

1960 births
Living people
Indian cricketers
Bengal cricketers
Cricketers from Kolkata